Newtown, Virginia may refer to:

Newtown, Albemarle County, Virginia
Newtown, Greene County, Virginia
Newtown, King and Queen County, Virginia
Newtown, Lancaster County, Virginia
Newtown, Virginia Beach, Virginia, in Princess Anne County, Virginia
Stephens City, Virginia, which was formerly known as Newtown